Dybvad is a small town situated in the south of Frederikshavn Municipality in north Jutland, Denmark.

The population of Dybvad is 592 (1 January 2022). The town has excellent road links to Frederikshavn to the north, and Aalborg to the south. The town is surrounded chiefly by open farmland.

Although a quiet town, Dybvad hosts an open-air music festival in August, called Dybvad Open Air. The festival is usually attended by approximately 2000 people and is held at Søparken (the lake park).

References

External links
 Dybvad Town
 Dybvad Open Air
 Frederikshavn Kommune: Dybvad

Cities and towns in the North Jutland Region
Frederikshavn Municipality